Clay County is a county in the U.S. state of Illinois. As of the 2010 United States Census, the population was 13,815. Since 1842, its county seat has been Louisville, in the center of the county's area.

In 1950, the U.S. Census Bureau placed the mean center of U.S. population in Clay County.

History
The future Clay County had been inhabited for thousands of years by the Illiniwek Indians (the remains of an Indian village's burial ground are still visible west of Ingraham). White explorers used or cleared a trail between the future settlements of Saint Louis in Missouri, to Vincennes in Indiana; this became a mail route in 1805. The first white settler (McCauley, from Kentucky) built a cabin in 1809 near this road at its intersection with a trail from Vandalia to Mt. Carmel. He was driven out by the Indians, but had returned by 1819, by which time other cabins had been constructed in the area, which was originally called Habbardsville. The Indians were removed from the area in 1828.

Clay County was authorized by act of the state legislature on 23 December 1824, by partitioning portions of Wayne, Crawford, and Fayette counties. It was named for American statesman Henry Clay, a member of the United States Senate from Kentucky and United States Secretary of State. Clay was a candidate for president in 1824.

The first appointed commissioners met on 8 March 1825 to organize the county government. Land for county building purposes was donated near Habbardsville. The commissioners accepted the offer, renamed it Maysville, and had a two-room courthouse erected on the property by the end of the year. The seat remained at that location (about a mile south of the present community of Clay City) through 1841, and in 1842 the county government began functioning in Louisville, being at the center of the county's area.

The first railroad line through Clay County was laid between 1850 and 1854, the Ohio and Mississippi Line. By 1855–56, the Illinois Central Railroad had also been constructed across the northwest corner of the county.

Geography

The low rolling hills of Clay County are devoted to agricultural production. The various drainage areas are still largely wooded. The Little Wabash River flows southeastward through the center of the county, while Muddy Creek drains the eastern portion (the meanders of Little Muddy delineate a portion of the county's east border with Richland County). Buck Creek, in the south part of the county, flows eastward and joins the Little Wabash above Clay City. Raccoon Creek flows southeastward from the lower part of the county into Wayne County. The highest point on the terrain ( ASL) is a small point along the western border with Marion County.

The county produced excellent timber during the nineteenth century, and some sandstone and limestone. The soil is light and not considered adapted to farming on a large scale.

Adjacent counties

 Effingham County - north
 Jasper County - northeast
 Richland County - east
 Wayne County - south
 Marion County - west
 Fayette County - northwest

Major highways
  I-57
  US 45
  US 50
  IL 37

Protected areas
 Martin T Snyder Memorial Nature Preserve

Cities
 Flora

Villages

 Clay City
 Iola
 Louisville (seat)
 Sailor Springs
 Xenia

Unincorporated communities

 Bible Grove
 Camp Travis
 Cruse
 Greendale
 Hoosier
 Hord
 Ingraham
 Kenner
 Oskaloosa
 Riffle
 Wendelin

Townships

 Bible Grove
 Blair
 Clay City
 Harter
 Hoosier
 Larkinsburg
 Louisville
 Oskaloosa
 Pixley
 Songer
 Stanford
 Xenia

Climate and weather

Demographics

2010 census
As of the 2010 United States Census, there were 13,815 people, 5,697 households, and 3,790 families in the county. The racial makeup of the county was 97.7% white, 0.5% Asian, 0.3% black or African American, 0.2% American Indian, 0.5% from other races, and 0.8% from two or more races. Those of Hispanic or Latino origin made up 1.1% of the population. In terms of ancestry, 21.7% were German, 14.6% were American, 12.6% were Irish, and 8.6% were English.

Of the 5,697 households, 29.5% had children under the age of 18 living with them, 52.1% were married couples living together, 9.4% had a female householder with no husband present, 33.5% were non-families, and 28.9% of all households were made up of individuals. The average household size was 2.37 and the average family size was 2.89. The median age was 42.2 years.

The median income for a household in the county was $38,016 and the median income for a family was $48,659. Males had a median income of $38,191 versus $27,347 for females. The per capita income for the county was $20,802. About 11.2% of families and 16.3% of the population were below the poverty line, including 21.4% of those under age 18 and 14.7% of those age 65 or over.

Education

 Clay City Community Unit District 10
 Dieterich Community Unit School District 30
 Effingham Community Unit School District 40
 Flora Community Unit School District 35
 Jasper County Community Unit School District 1
 North Clay Community Unit School District 25
 North Clay High School
 South Central Community Unit School District 401

Politics
As part of Upper Southern-leaning Southern Illinois, Clay County is powerfully Republican. No Democratic presidential nominee has won a majority in Clay County since Lyndon Johnson’s 1964 landslide, and typically for the region recent presidential elections have seen dramatic declines in Democratic support.

See also
 National Register of Historic Places listings in Clay County, Illinois

References

 United States Census Bureau 2007 TIGER/Line Shapefiles
 United States Board on Geographic Names (GNIS)
 United States National Atlas

External links
 Illinois State Archives

 
Illinois counties
1824 establishments in Illinois
Populated places established in 1824
Clay County, Illinois